Comitas saldanhae is a species of sea snail, a marine gastropod mollusc in the family Pseudomelatomidae, the turrids and allies.

Description
The length of the shell varies between 40 mm and 50 mm.

Distribution
This marine species occurs off Orange River, South Africa

References

 Barnard, 1958. Contribution to the knowledge of South African marine mollusca Part I. Gastropoda. Posobranchiata, Toxoglossa.
 Nolf F. (2011) A northern range extension for Comitas saldanhae (Barnard, 1958) (Mollusca: Gastropoda: Clavatulidae). Neptunea 10(2): 1–4

External links
Biolib.cz: Comitas saldanhae
 
 

Endemic fauna of South Africa
saldanhae
Gastropods described in 1958